Jan van Rijn or Jean de Reyn was born at Dunkirk about the year 1610, and went when he was young to Antwerp, where he became a student of van Dyck. Such was his progress under that master, that he was invited to accompany him to England, where he continued to assist him until the death of his
illustrious instructor. He afterwards established himself in his native town, where he painted several admirable pictures for the churches, and was much employed as a portrait painter. His principal works for the churches at Dunkirk were the 'Death of the four Royal Martyrs,' for the church of St. Eloi; and the 'Baptism of Totila,' for the church of the English convent.

There are many of his portraits in private collections, which are little inferior to those of Van Dyck. The principal altarpiece in the parochial church of St. Martin, at Bergues St. Vinox, near Dunkirk, is by this master: it represents 'Herodias bringing the Head of St. John to Herod.' De Reyn died at Dunkirk in 1678.
The Brussels Museum has a Female Portrait by him, dated 1637.

References
 

1610 births
1678 deaths
17th-century Flemish painters
People from Dunkirk